Blessing Oladoye (born 4 September 2000) is a Nigerian athlete. She competed in the women's 4 × 400 metres relay event at the 2019 World Athletics Championships. In 2019, she won the gold medal in the women's 4 × 400 metres relay at the 2019 African Games held in Rabat, Morocco.

References

External links

2000 births
Living people
Nigerian female sprinters
Place of birth missing (living people)
World Athletics Championships athletes for Nigeria
African Games gold medalists for Nigeria
African Games medalists in athletics (track and field)
Athletes (track and field) at the 2019 African Games
21st-century Nigerian women